The Roman Catholic Diocese of Konongo–Mampong is a diocese located in the city of Konongo–Mampong in the Ecclesiastical province of Kumasi in Ghana.

History
The diocese of Konongo‑Mampong was created on 3 March 1995 by Pope John Paul II. It was carved out of two other dioceses, namely the diocese of Kumasi and the diocese of Sunyani. About 90% of the territory of the new diocese of Konongo- Mampong belonged to the diocese of Kumasi, which was created in 1950, having existed as a Vicariate for 18 years. The rest of the territory of the diocese belonged to the Sunyani diocese. Most Rev. Joseph Osei-Bonsu is the first Bishop of Konongo-Mampong. He was ordained bishop and installed on 28 May and 11 June 1995 respectively. Mampong is traditionally and historically second in importance to the Asante capital, Kumasi. Konongo is the oldest church in the diocese, its origins going back to 1917. It seems that it was for these reasons that Rome named the new diocese the "Konongo-Mampong Diocese". On 28 December 2007 the Diocese of Techiman was erected from the Sunyani and Konongo-Mampong Dioceses. The following parishes were taken from Konongo-Mampong and given to the new diocese of Techiman: Yeji, Atebubu, Kwame Danso and Prang. Governance The diocese has established or constituted certain councils, commissions and committees to assist the Bishop in governing the entire diocese. The table below gives their composition and key functions.

The Cathedral is St. Paul Cathedral in Mampong-Ashanti. The Co-Cathedral is St. Gabriel's Co-Cathedral in Konongo, Ashanti-Akim.

Deaneries 
 Konongo Deanery: Rev. Fr. Daniel Fosu 

 Jamasi Deanery: Rev. Fr. Raphael Osei Soadwah
 Ejusi Deanery: Rev. Fr. Gregory Amponsah-Nkansah
 Mamponteng Deanery: Rev. Fr. Savino Gyimah
 Mampong Deanery: Rev. Fr. Anthony Twum Barimah

Leadership
Bishops of Konongo–Mampong (Roman rite)

Most Rev. Joseph Osei-Bonsu was born on 8 February 1948 in Jamasi, Ashanti. He studied at the St. Teresa's Minor Seminary at Amisano from 1962 to 1969. In 1969 he entered the St. Peter's Regional Seminary, Pedu, Cape Coast, from where he proceeded in 1970 to Ushaw College, a Catholic Major Seminary in Durham, England, to continue his training for the priesthood. While at Ushaw College he obtained a B.A. (Hons) in Theology at the University of Durham in 1974. On completion of his studies at Ushaw College in 1975, he returned to Ghana and was ordained a priest at the St. Peter's Cathedral, Kumasi, on 3 August 1975 by the Most Rev. Peter Kwasi Sarpong. He worked at the St. Mary's Church, South Suntreso, Kumasi, for one year as an Assistant Parish Priest. During this time he looked after 49 outstations of the St. Mary's Parish. In September 1976 he went for further studies in the United Kingdom. He obtained a Ph.D in New Testament Exegesis at the University of Aberdeen, Scotland, in December 1980. In April 1981 he was appointed lecturer in the Department for the Study of Religions, University of Ghana, Legon, where he taught New Testament Studies, New Testament Greek and Early Church History. From October 1992 to January 1995 he was the Head of the Department for the Study of Religions, University of Ghana. He also taught New Testament at St. Paul's Seminary, Sowutuom, Accra, on a part-time basis. In 1992 he was appointed by the Pope to be a member of the International Theological Commission based in Rome. He held this post until October 1997. Pastorally he worked as Chaplain to the Catholic community at the University of Ghana and at Kwabenya from 1981 to 1995. For over ten years he was the National Chaplain of the International Movement of Catholic Students (Pax Romana), Ghana Federation. Apart from a year's sabbatical at St. John's University, Collegeville, Minnesota, U.S.A., in 1987-1988, he worked at the University of Ghana from April 1981 till January, 1995. Granted a year's sabbatical leave by the University of Ghana in January 1995, he went to Rome lecture in New Testament Exegesis at the Pontifical Beda College, a seminary for late vocation students. While he was at the Pontifical Beda College, he was appointed the first Bishop of the newly-erected Diocese of Konongo-Mampong on 17 March 1995. He was ordained bishop on 28 May 1995 along with four others in Accra. He was installed the first bishop of the Konongo-Mampong Diocese on 11 June 1995. He is the Chairman of the Board of the Trustees of the Otumfuo Education Fund, Kumasi, Chairman of the Board of Trustees of the Catholic University College of Ghana at Fiapre, near Sunyani, and a former member of the Ghana Education Service Council of the Ministry of Education. From 1992 to 1997 he was a member of the International Theological Commission based in Rome and at that time under the presidency of Cardinal Joseph Ratzinger, now Pope Benedict XVI. He is currently a member of the Methodist-Catholic Dialogue Commission which comes under the Pontifical Council for Promoting Christian Unity in Rome. He is the Chairman of the Ghana Association of Biblical Exegetes (GABES).He was once the president of Ghana Catholic Bishop's conference (G.C.B.C)

See also
Roman Catholicism in Ghana

References

External links
 GCatholic.org
 Catholic Hierarchy

Konongo-Mampong
Konongo-Mampong
Christian organizations established in 1995
Roman Catholic dioceses and prelatures established in the 20th century
Roman Catholic Ecclesiastical Province of Kumasi